Francis Boyce may refer to:

Francis Bertie Boyce (1844–1931), Australian social reformer
Francis Stewart Boyce (1872–1940), his son, Australian politician and judge